is the fifth series in Toei Company's Super Sentai tokusatsu metaseries. It was broadcast from February 7, 1981, to January 30, 1982, replacing Denshi Sentai Denjiman and was replaced by Dai Sentai Goggle-V. The program first Super Sentai series to serve as a direct sequel to its previous series (Denshi Sentai Denjiman). It is also the first and only series in the franchise to have an all-male Super Sentai team and the first to have fewer than five members in the core team. Its international English title as listed by Toei Company is Sunvulcan.

Plot
The threat of the Machine Empire Black Magma causes the United Nations to establish the Solar Sentai at a summit. From the UN's Guardians of World Peace's (GWP) air force, navy, and rangers, Commander Arashiyama assembles three specialists to become Sun Vulcan. When Black Magma learns of this, he attacks the GWP's base, but Sun Vulcan debuts in time to save it. Führer Hell Saturn prays to the Black Solar God and is rewarded with a revived Queen Hedrian, now a cyborg with a mechanical heart and a metallic afro. Black Magma multiple plots, even with Hedrian's aid, fails. Following the death of 01, Amazon Killer, (a Vader) arrives from space, destroying the Sun Vulcan Base. A new Vulcan Base is then built.

The original Vul Eagle, Ryusuke Ohwashi, is replaced by a friend and master of the sword, Takayuki Hiba (who first appeared in episode 23).

Characters

Guardians of World Peace
The Japanese branch of the GWP is Sun Vulcan's secret headquarters, with the restaurant Snack Safari and a safari park acting as a front.

Sun Vulcan
Sun Vulcan is the name of the Guardians of World Peace's Taiyo Sentai, they are the first and only Super Sentai core team to be all-male. Each of the Sun Vulcan members identifies himself before the group says . Ryusuke, Kinya and Asao's last names also Takayuki's given name include the Japanese names of their totem animals.
 : The red-colored leader of the Sun Vulcan team whose moniker was used by its original user and his successor.
 : A GWP air force officer whose skills made him the top pilot in the organization. He left to pursue space shuttle research for NASA in the United States.  
 : A colleague of Ohwashi and master of kendo. Takayuki took over for Ryusuke after he left for NASA shuttle research. Along with his fellow Red Rangers from Gorenger to Timeranger, Takayuki appeared in Hyakujuu Sentai Gaoranger vs. Super Sentai. Takayuki appeared in the final episode of Kaizoku Sentai Gokaiger, receiving his powers back in the form of the Vuleagle Key as the Gokaigers left Earth.
 Special moves: Hiba Gaeshi (Hiba Return), Shin Hiba Gaeshi (New Hiba Return) Secret Sword Style Cross Cut.
 : A GWP naval officer who's also an oceanographer, Kinya spent most of his childhood in Africa. Having lost his parents and younger brother during an altercation, Kinya's hatred for any form of violence motivated him to volunteer for the Sun Vulcan project.
 : A GWP army officer who can climb any surface. Despite his courage in battle, he has an unusual fear of dogs - especially CC.

Arsenal
 : The transformation device of the Sun Vulcan. The transformation call is "Sun Vulcan!" (or, for individual members, their codename).
 : The standard-issue weapon for the Sun Vulcans.
 : A bomb shaped like a volleyball. Vul Eagle kicks it first ("One!"), Vul Panther then passes it ("Two!") to Vul Shark, who throws it in the air ("Three!"). Vul Eagle then yells, "Go!" before jumping over his partners and spiking the ball towards the target.
 : Newer, more powerful version of the Vulcan Ball shaped and thrown like an American football. Used by Sun Vulcan to execute the Triple Cross maneuver.

Mecha
 : The flying fortress. Its jaws open to let the components of the Sun Vulcan Robo launch.
 : The first combining Sentai robot, and also the first to "talk" in the form of shouting attack techniques. Cosmo Vulcan and Bull Vulcan combine when the command  is given.
 : A jet piloted by Vul Eagle. It is stored in the mouth of the Jaguar Vulcan. It forms the head, upper arms, and body of the Sun Vulcan Robo.
 : A bulldozer-like vehicle with two cockpits; one for the left half and the other for the right half. It is piloted by Vul Shark and Vul Panther and is stored in the rear of the Jaguar Vulcan, divided in half. It forms the forearms and feet of the Sun Vulcan Robo, with the feet storing the forearms.

Vehicles
 : The car of Vul Eagle (a British Leyland Moke).
 : The blue Motorbike of Vul Shark.
 : The green Motorbike of Vul Panther.

Allies
 : The commander of the GWP, who is also an expert at robotics. He designed the team's mecha. He is also the owner of the Snack Safari restaurant and he cares for the animals in the zoo that the SunVulcan base is built on.
 : The Commander's daughter, serving as his secretary. In Episode 29, she transforms into  (likely through the quick-change talent that she shares with many Super Sentai heroines) to aid the Sun Vulcans in their battle against Red Rose Mask (Rose Monger).
 : An intelligent dog cared by the Arashiyamas. He is trained by Misa to speak fluent Japanese.

Mechanical Empire Black Magma
 is an organization based at the Iron Claw Castle at the North Pole that worships the Black Solar God. Intending to have its Mechahumans rule the world, Black Magma's technology is advanced enough to cause natural disasters and cause global incidents. However, Black Magma targets Japan in order to obtain the cache of geothermal energy there needed to power their arsenal.

 : The true leader of Black Magma, known as the Black Solar God. He is hinted to have connections to the Incan and Mayan civilizations. He normally communicates to Hell Saturn via an idol.
 : Though he rules over Black Magma, he is actually a servant of the Omnipotent God.
 : Originally the leader of the Vader Clan, she was found frozen at the North Pole by the Omnipotent God and revived as a cyborg with a mechanical heart. As a result, instead of avenging her Vader Clansmen, Hedrian is forced to serve Black Magma as the Omnipotent God's high priestess with Hell Saturn able to shut down her mechanical heart should she betray them. After Hell Saturn is seemingly destroyed, Hedrian took over the Black Magma leadership until the ghost of her predecessor appeared just when she kidnapped Misa through her sorcery and induced cardiac arrest with the shutdown of her heart. She is portrayed by Machiko Soga.
 : A quartet of female spies numbered 01-04. 01 wears red and is armed with throwing knives, 02 wears black and is armed with cards, 03 wears green and is armed with dual swords and 04 wears purple and is armed with yo-yos. While Zero Girl 01 died, the remaining three survive until they die piloting King Magma during the final battle.
 : A red-suited member of the Zero Girls who functions as the active field commander, armed with throwing knives. She is killed as the result of a cave-in.
 : A Vader field officer who came from space, loyal only to Hedrian. Taking Zero Girl 01's place as the field commander, Amazon Killer succeeded in destroying the Sun Vulcan's Head Base and did her job very actively in both combat and stealth. After Hedrian's death, Amazon Killer was forced to fight the Sun Vulcan, who came to rescue Daizaburou and Misa. She had them on the ropes, but surviving their combination attack, Amazon Killer took her own life out of a refusal of serve Black Magma.
 : A space pirate who is known as the  who is sought by the Galactic Police. Once Amazon Killer's partner, Inazuma is manipulated into challenging Hell Saturn by her and Queen Hedrian. Inazuma seems to defeat Hell Saturn in the episode, allowing Queen Hedrian to declare herself ruler of Black Magma. However, Hell Saturn returns as a ghost and get his revenge by tossing Inazuma into the monster-making machine transforming him into Inazuma Monger who meets his end against the Sun Vulcan team.
 : A series of spy mechanoids used by Hell Saturn for infiltration and assassinations, stronger than normal humans. Constructed with care, the mechanoids are placed in a torturous combat testing with the survivors branded as Dark Q and must succeed in their missions or be obliterated for failure. About 96 models were made before the 97th was created as the finalized model for Black Magma to use in its invasion. The 97th posed as Kagayama, becoming Arashiyama's aide to uncover info on Sun Vulcan Robo before she is exposed and ejected from the base before she self-destructs. The 97th model, armed with claws, aided in stealing a dangerous bacteria in Black Magma's scheme to cause conflict. A 98th model was built to kill various important figures considered national treasures in Japan, only to be stopped in her tracks. The 99th model, equipped with a detachable arm that doubles as flame thrower poses as an officer to obtain the contents of a vault. But her failure to secure it results in her destruction with the 100th model utilized to complete Black Magma's plan to build a fortress underground before she is destroyed by the Sun Vulcan group. Eventually, the Dark Q series is discontinued.
 : The android grunts in black with the red insignia of Black Magma on their faces. Not to be confused with Seiun Kamen Machineman.

Arsenal
 : Black Magma's black fighter planes with the red insignia of Black Magma.
 : A giant robot controlled by Zero Girls 02-04.

Episodes

Movie
A Sun Vulcan movie written by Shozo Uehara and directed by Shohei Tojo was released on July 18, 1981, at the Toei Manga Festival (on the same day episode 24 aired). It takes place some time after episode 23.

Cast
 Ryusuke Ohwashi: 
 Takayuki Hiba: 
 Kinya Samejima: 
 Asao Hyou: 
 Daizaburo Arashiyama: 
 Misa Arashiyama: 
 Führer Hell Saturn (Voice): Shōzō Iizuka
 Queen Hedrian: Machiko Soga
 Inazuma Gingar (Voice): Takeshi Watabe
 Zero One: Takako Kitagawa
 Zero Two: Mariko Hikashi 
 Zero Three: Yuki Udagawa
 Zero Four: Toshiko Takashima (1-4) and Kyoko Hiro (5-50)
 Narration: Tōru Ōhira
 Amazon Killer: Yukie Kagawa
 Sun Vulcan Robo: Eiji Kanie

Songs
Opening theme
 
 Lyrics: Keisuke Yamakawa
 Composition: Michiaki Watanabe
 Artist: Akira Kushida & Koorogi '73

Ending themes
 
 Lyrics: Keisuke Yamakawa
 Composition: Michiaki Watanabe
 Artist: Akira Kushida
 Episodes: 1-33
 
 Lyrics: Keisuke Yamakawa
 Composition: Michiaki Watanabe
 Artist: Akira Kushida
 Episodes: 34-50

International broadcasts
Sun Vulcan was aired in the Philippines on Banahaw Broadcasting Corporation from 1984 to 1985.

Notes

References

External links
 Taiyo Sentai Sun Vulcan at the Super Sentai website 

1981 Japanese television series debuts
1982 Japanese television series endings
Japanese fantasy television series
Super Sentai
Television shows based on Marvel Comics
1980s Japanese television series
TV Asahi original programming
Fiction about the Sun
Fictional soldiers